European Retail Park Brăila (ERP Brăila) is a commercial complex in Romania. It was developed by the Belgian company  with an investment fund of 60 million euros and was inaugurated in May 2008. In September 2009 it was acquired by  through a transaction of 63 million euros.

The commercial complex is proyected to serve to one million people throughout six nearby counties, more precisely the Brăila, Buzău, Galați, Ialomița, Tulcea and Vrancea counties. The main tenants of the latter include Deichmann SE, KFC, New Yorker and many others.

References

External links
 
 

2008 establishments in Romania
Buildings and structures in Brăila County
Shopping malls in Romania